This is a list of Albanians in North Macedonia that includes both Macedonian people of Albanian descent and Albanian immigrants that have resided in Macedonia. The list is sorted by the fields or occupations in which the notable individual has maintained the most influence.

For inclusion in this list, each individual must have a Wikipedia article and show that they are Albanian and have lived in Macedonia.

History and politics 
 George Ghica – Prince of Moldavia and Wallachia 
 Mother Teresa – nun. Recipient of the 1979 Nobel Peace Prize
 Blerim Reka – Politician in North Macedonia
 Arianiti family – Albanian noble family, lord of Debar
 Zana Ramadani – German politician 
 Nexhmije Hoxha – Enver Hoxha's wife
 Arabacı Ali Pasha – Ottoman grand vizier from 1691 to 1692
 Mustafa Baruti – politician. One of the signatories of the Albanian Declaration of Independence
 Dervish Cara – revolutionary and nationalist. A leader in the Albanian Revolt of 1844
 Alajdin Demiri – politician
 Fuat Dibra – World War II collaborator, member of the High Regency Council of Albania 
 Vehbi Dibra – politician and theologist. One of the signatories of the Albanian Declaration of Independence and the first Grand Mufti of Albania
 Gajur Deralla – World War II collaborator of Balli Kombëtar
 Mehmet Akif Pasha – Albanian-Ottoman statesman and governor of the Ottoman Empire
 Eyüp Sabri Akgöl – Ottoman-Albanian revolutionary and one of the leaders of the Young Turk Revolution
 Mehmet Pashë Dërralla – politician. One of the signatories of the Albanian Declaration of Independence
 Mustafa Ruhi Efendi – religious (Naqshbandi) and political leader. President of the Central Committee of the League of Prizren
 Gropa family – Albanian noble family, lord of Ohrid
 Dervish Hima – publisher and nationalist. One of the signatories of the Albanian Declaration of Independence
 Ohrili Hüseyin Pasha – Grand Vizier
 Ahmed Izzet Pasha – Grand Vizier
 Sherif Langu – politician. One of the signatories of the Albanian Declaration of Independence
 Ahmed Niyazi Bey – politician, Adjuntant Major, revolutionary and an instigator of the Young Turk Revolution (1908)
 Köprülü Mehmed Pasha – Influential Turkish Turcologist, scholar, Minister of Foreign Affairs and Deputy Prime Minister of the Republic of Turkey.
 Mefail Shehu – World War II collaborator of Balli Kombëtar
 Nuri Sojliu – politician. One of the signatories of the Albanian Declaration of Independence
 Arbën Xhaferi – politician
 Ali Ahmeti – Macedonian-Albanian politician
 Bujar Osmani – Macedonian-Albanian politician 
 Talat Xhaferi – Parliamentary speaker of the Republic of Macedonia
 Branko Manoilovski – Macedonian politician of Albanian Orthodox descent
 Teuta Arifi – Macedonian politician
 Fatmir Besimi – Macedonian politician and economist
 Menduh Thaçi – Leader of the Macedonian political party Democratic Party of Albanians
 Ogerta Manastirliu – Albanian Socialist Party politician
 Nevzat Halili – Macedonian politician

Military
 Moisi Golemi – Albanian nobleman and a commander of the League of Lezhë
 Patrona Halil – was the instigator of a mob uprising in 1730 which replaced Sultan Ahmed III with Mahmud I and ended the Tulip period
 Xhezair Shaqiri – UÇK leader
 Mujdin Aliu – UÇK freedom fighter the 112th Brigade of the NLA, which fought in Mujdin's home town of Tetovo, was named the Mujdin Aliu Brigade.
 Kâzım Özalp –  Turkish military officer, politician, and one of the leading figures in the Turkish War of Independence.
 Ismet Jashari – UÇK leader
 Agim Krasniqi - UÇK leader
 Hayrullah Fişek – General in the Ottoman army, Undersecretary of State, Ministry of National Defence
 Hafëz Jusuf Azemi – World War II collaborator of Balli Kombëtar
 Ali Shefqet Shkupi – first Chief of Supreme Staff of the Albanian Army
 Rexhep Jusufi – World War II collaborator of Balli Kombëtar 
 Xhem Hasa – World War II collaborator of Balli Kombëtar
 Tajar Tetova – revolutionary and nationalist
 Elez Isufi – Albanian nationalist figure and guerrilla fighter

Science and academia

 Josif Bageri – educator, poet and nationalist figure.
 Mehmet Gega – teacher and Albanian rights activist 
 Sehadete Mekuli – physician
 Gjerasim Qiriazi – educator. The founder of the Protestant Church of Albania  which opened on 15 October 1891.
 Parashqevi Qiriazi – educator. Chairwoman of the Congress of Manastir
 Petro Janura – Personality of the Albanian language, literature, and folklore in Yugoslavia
 Tajar Zavalani – Albanian historian, publicist, and writer
 Sevasti Qiriazi – educator. Pioneer of Albanian female education
 Gjergj Qiriazi – writer. One of the founders of the Albanian printing press Bashkimi i Kombit
 Ibrahim Temo – doctor. One of the founders of the Society for the Publication of Albanian Writings
 Rexhep Voka – scholar and activist of the Albanian national awakening
 Ferid Murad – Medical Researcher
 Bajazid Doda – Albanian ethnographic writer and photographer

Musicians 
 Bebe Rexha - singer, songwriter 
 Adrian Gaxha – singer
 Arif Şentürk – folk singer
 Bardhi – rapper
 Tuna – female singer
 Lorenc Antoni –  composer, conductor, and ethnomusicologist
 Lindon Berisha – singer, songwriter
 Shpat Kasapi – singer
 Kanita – singer
 Venera Lumani – female singer
 Elita 5 – rock music group
 Çiljeta – Albanian pop singer and model
 Shkëlzen Baftiari – Albanian pianist

Arts and entertainment 
 Sabri Berkel – Painter
 René Redzepi – Danish chef
 Bajazid Doda – photographer and author
 Rıza Tevfik Bölükbaşı  –  Turkish philosopher, poet, politician of liberal signature and a community leader
 Abdurrahim Buza – painter
Adem Kastrati – painter
 Sabri Kalkandelen – poet, chief of the Istanbul Imperial Library
 Omer Kaleshi – Painter
 Mimoza Veliu – Albanian photographer

Cinema 
 Blerim Destani – actor
 Tolgahan Sayışman – Turkish actor and model
 Avni Qahili – journalist
 Tony Dovolani – Dancing with the stars

Sports

 Shkodran Mustafi – footballer
 Lirim Zendeli – German racer
 Arbresha Rexhepi – Professional Judo Fighter
 Agim Sopi- Soccer coach
 Enis Bardhi – footballer
 Taulant Seferi – footballer 
 Riza Durmisi – footballer 
 Hakan Şükür – footballer 
 Blerim Džemaili – footballer
 Bajram Fetai – footballer
 Arijan Ademi – Macedonian professional footballer who plays for GNK Dinamo Zagreb and Macedonian national team
 Erten Ersu – footballer
 Dilly Duka – footballer
 Pajtim Kasami – footballer
 Refik Resmja – footballer
 Admir Mehmedi – footballer
 Besir Demiri – Albanian professional footballer who plays for Mariupol and the Albania National Football Team
 Sertan Vardar –  Turkish professional footballer
 Orhan Mustafi – footballer
 Naser Aliji – footballer
 Nedim Bajrami – footballer
 Armend Alimi – footballer
 Ezgjan Alioski – footballer
 Mirjeta Bajramoska – handballer 
 Ferhan Hasani – footballer
 Agim Ibraimi – footballer
 Enver Idrizi – karateka
 Edis Maliqi – footballer
 Xhelil Asani – footballer
 Mirdi Limani – kickboxer
 Valon Ahmedi – footballer
 Gentjana Rochi – footballer 
 Berat Sadik – footballer
 Safer Sali – wrestler. Competed in the 1972 Summer Olympics
 Nuri Seferi – boxer. Former WBO European Cruiserweight Champion
 Sefer Seferi – boxer
 Shaban Sejdiu – wrestler. Olympic and World Championship medalist
 Artim Šakiri – footballer  
 Shaban Tërstena – wrestler. Olympic gold medalist and World Championship medalist
 Leonard Zuta – footballer
 Lindon Selahi – footballer
 Ertan Demiri – footballer
 Ilir Elmazovski – footballer
 Muhamed Demiri – footballer
 Muzafer Ejupi – footballer
 Izair Emini – footballer
 Jasir Asani – footballer
 Drita Islami – Macedonian hurdler
 Xhelil Abdulla – Macedonian professional footballer
 Besart Abdurahimi – Macedonian footballer
 Dardan Dehari – Macedonian alpine ski racer
 Fisnik Zuka – footballer
 Suat Zendeli – footballer
 Egzon Belica – footballer
 Nijaz Lena – footballer
 Valon Ethemi – footballer
 Zeni Husmani – footballer
 Demir Imeri – footballer
 Enis Fazlagikj – footballer
 Sedat Berisha – footballer
 Emin Sulimani – footballer
 Afrodita Salihi – footballer
 Mevlan Adili – footballer

References

Macedonia
Macedonia
Ethnic groups in Macedonia (region)